The 2020 All England Open (officially known as the Yonex All England Open Badminton Championships 2020 for sponsorship reasons) was a badminton tournament which took place at Arena Birmingham in England from 11 to 15 March 2020. It had a total purse of $1,100,000.

Tournament
The 2020 All England Open became the fifth tournament of the 2020 BWF World Tour following the postponement of the 2020 German Open due to the ongoing coronavirus outbreak. It was a part of the All England Open championships, which had been held since 1899. This tournament was organized by Badminton England and sanctioned by the BWF.

Venue
This international tournament was held at Arena Birmingham in Birmingham, England.

Point distribution
Below is the point distribution for each phase of the tournament based on the BWF points system for the BWF World Tour Super 1000 event.

Prize money
The total prize money for this tournament was US$1,100,000. Distribution of prize money was in accordance with BWF regulations.

Men's singles

Seeds

 Chou Tien-chen (final)
 Viktor Axelsen (champion)
 Chen Long (quarter-finals)
 Anthony Sinisuka Ginting (first round)
 Anders Antonsen (semi-finals, retired)
 Jonatan Christie (first round)
 Shi Yuqi (quarter-finals)
 Ng Ka Long (first round)

Finals

Top half

Section 1

Section 2

Bottom half

Section 3

Section 4

Women's singles

Seeds

 Chen Yufei (final)
 Tai Tzu-ying (champion)
 Akane Yamaguchi (quarter-finals)
 Nozomi Okuhara (semi-finals)
 Ratchanok Intanon (quarter-finals)
 P. V. Sindhu (quarter-finals)
 He Bingjiao (second round)
 Carolina Marín (semi-finals)

Finals

Top half

Section 1

Section 2

Bottom half

Section 3

Section 4

Men's doubles

Seeds

 Marcus Fernaldi Gideon / Kevin Sanjaya Sukamuljo (final)
 Mohammad Ahsan / Hendra Setiawan (quarter-finals)
 Li Junhui / Liu Yuchen (second round)
 Takeshi Kamura / Keigo Sonoda (second round)
 Fajar Alfian / Muhammad Rian Ardianto (second round)
 Hiroyuki Endo / Yuta Watanabe (champions)
 Lee Yang / Wang Chi-lin (semi-finals)
 Aaron Chia / Soh Wooi Yik (quarter-finals)

Finals

Top half

Section 1

Section 2

Bottom half

Section 3

Section 4

Women's doubles

Seeds

 Chen Qingchen / Jia Yifan (quarter-finals)
 Mayu Matsumoto / Wakana Nagahara (quarter-finals)
 Yuki Fukushima / Sayaka Hirota (champions)
 Lee So-hee / Shin Seung-chan (semi-finals)
 Kim So-yeong / Kong Hee-yong (quarter-finals)
 Du Yue / Li Yinhui (final)
 Misaki Matsutomo / Ayaka Takahashi (semi-finals)
 Greysia Polii / Apriyani Rahayu (first round)

Finals

Top half

Section 1

Section 2

Bottom half

Section 3

Section 4

Mixed doubles

Seeds

 Zheng Siwei / Huang Yaqiong (second round)
 Wang Yilyu / Huang Dongping (quarter-finals)
 Dechapol Puavaranukroh / Sapsiree Taerattanachai (final)
 Yuta Watanabe / Arisa Higashino (second round)
 Praveen Jordan / Melati Daeva Oktavianti (champions)
 Seo Seung-jae / Chae Yoo-jung (semi-finals)
 Chan Peng Soon / Goh Liu Ying (first round)
 Hafiz Faizal / Gloria Emanuelle Widjaja (quarter-finals)

Finals

Top half

Section 1

Section 2

Bottom half

Section 3

Section 4

References

External links
 Tournament Link
 Official Website

All England Open Badminton Championships
All England Open
All England
All England
International sports competitions in Birmingham, West Midlands